University of Virginia is a census-designated place in Albemarle County, Virginia. The population as of the 2010 Census was 7,704.

Geography 
As the name infers, the CDP encompasses the University of Virginia grounds (that part which is outside incorporated Charlottesville), along with several adjacent off-grounds housing areas, including University Heights, which was formerly its own CDP.

Demographics

References

Census-designated places in Albemarle County, Virginia
Census-designated places in Virginia